Matt Schultz (born July 23, 1979) is an American Republican politician who served as Iowa Secretary of State.

Biography
Schultz grew up in West Des Moines, Iowa and graduated from Valley High School, Brigham Young University–Idaho, the University of Iowa, and the Creighton University School of Law.

He is an Eagle Scout, and is active in the Church of Jesus Christ of Latter-day Saints (LDS Church). He served a two-year mission for the church in Argentina. He and his wife, Zola, live in Madison County with their five children.

He was elected to public office in 2005 as a city councilman in Council Bluffs, Iowa, where he served for five years.

Iowa Secretary of State
He was elected to the position of Secretary of State in 2010, and was the youngest secretary of state in the country.

While in office, Schultz created a new statewide lien registration system and focused on a new voter-ID law.  He also worked to ease the voting process for active members of the military from Iowa.

On July 20, 2012 Schultz approved two emergency voter fraud rules that would allow him to challenge the registration of voters if their names are similar to names found on state and federal lists of foreign nationals and also approved a rule allowing people to file complaints of voter fraud without oaths via e-mail.

In December 2013, it was reported that an investigation by the office of the Secretary of State was passing along 16 cases of voter fraud to local county officials. As of December 17, 2013, five people pleaded guilty to attempted voter fraud, and five other cases were dismissed.  On January 22, 2014, Schultz announced charges in nine additional voter fraud cases. Many of the original 16 charges, and all 9 of the later charges were on citizens convicted of felonies whose voting rights had not been restored.  State Auditor Mary Mosiman stated that Schultz' use of HAVA (Help American's Vote Act) funds might be in violation of their intended use. Mosiman said that Schultz' may be required to repay the federal grant if asked to do so.

The Des Moines Register on Feb 24, 2014 reported more than 80 (cases) have been referred to county attorneys for possible prosecution.  **Note -- Cases "referred" and prosecutions are two different things.

The Des Moines Register on May 15, 2014 reported that Iowa Secretary of State, Matt Schultz's voter fraud investigation cost taxpayers $250,000 and resulted in a total of 6 guilty pleas; equalling approximately $42,000 per guilty plea.

Schultz initiated the Rock Iowa program which partners with the national Rock the Vote organization to educate high school seniors about the electoral process and encourage them to register to vote.

Photo ID for voters
During his tenure as Iowa Secretary of State, Schultz supported legislation to require photo identification for voters.  He said a voter ID requirement was "common sense" and necessary to prevent voter fraud.

Iowa Democrats said that he was attempting to disenfranchise voters, and the ACLU of Iowa said that voter fraud is not a problem. Iowa Senate Democrats blocked the legislation, and The Gazette, an eastern Iowa newspaper reported, "Schultz has turned a reasonable, principled position into a political sideshow".

Subsequent career
On January 9, 2014, Schultz announced he would be a candidate for the U.S. House of Representatives. He ran to represent Iowa's 3rd congressional district, after the announcement by Congressman Tom Latham that he would be retiring from Congress in 2014. He finished third in the primary; receiving less than one fifth of total votes cast, and endorsed would be candidate David Young at convention.

He was instead the Republican nominee for Madison County attorney, winning the general election with 61%, defeating incumbent Democrat Julie Bardwell-Forsyth.

References

External links
Matt Schultz for Congress

Iowa city council members
Secretaries of State of Iowa
Latter Day Saints from Iowa
American Mormon missionaries in Argentina
Brigham Young University–Idaho alumni
University of Iowa alumni
Creighton University School of Law alumni
Iowa Republicans
Iowa lawyers
Living people
1979 births
District attorneys in Iowa